is a Japanese basketball player for Toyota Antelopes and the Japanese national team.

She participated at the 2017 FIBA Women's Asia Cup.

References

External links

1991 births
Living people
Japanese women's basketball players
People from Tochigi, Tochigi
Shooting guards